William MacKay (September 11, 1847 – November 8, 1915) was a physician and political figure in Nova Scotia, Canada. He represented Cape Breton County in the Nova Scotia House of Assembly from 1886 to 1890 and from 1894 to 1897 as a Conservative member and sat for Cape Breton division in the Senate of Canada from 1912 to 1915.

Biography
He was born in Earltown, Nova Scotia, the son of John MacKay, a Scottish immigrant. He was educated in Earlton, Pictou and New York City. In 1875, he married Catherine Campbell Sutherland. He was president of the Cape Breton Medical Society and served on the Board of Health. He also served as physician for several coal mines in Cape Breton. McKay was an unsuccessful candidate for a seat in the House of Commons in 1904.

He died in office on November 8, 1915.

References 

1847 births
1915 deaths
Progressive Conservative Association of Nova Scotia MLAs
Canadian senators from Nova Scotia
Nova Scotia political party leaders